Wanchalong (วันฉลอง) is a Thai Muay Thai fighter.

Biography and career

Wanchalong started boxing at 8 years old in small camp near his village. He later moved to the Sitsornong camp situated in Chachoengsao. Wanchalong stayed at this camp for most of his career before moving to the Bangkok gym PK.Saenchai in 2014.

Titles and accomplishments

Lumpinee Stadium
2009 Lumpinee Stadium 108 lbs Champion
2011 Lumpinee Stadium 115 lbs Champion (defended once)
2013 Lumpinee Stadium 115 lbs Champion (defended once)
2016 Lumpinee Stadium 115 lbs Champion
2012 Lumpinee Stadium Fight of the Year (vs Pentai Singpatong)
2014 Lumpinee Stadium Fight of the Year (vs Chaisiri Sakniranrat)
2015 Lumpinee Stadium Fight of the Year (vs Jomhod Eminentair)
Channel 7 Stadium
2010 Channel 7 Boxing Stadium 112 lbs Champion
2013 Channel 7 Boxing Stadium 115 lbs Champion
2015 Channel 7 Boxing Stadium 115 lbs Champion (defended once)
2019 Channel 7 Stadium 118 lbs Champion

Fight record

|-  style="background:#c5d2ea;"
| 2022-07-01|| Draw ||align=left| K.J FA Group || Muay Thai Fighter X || Bangkok, Thailand || Decision|| 5 || 3:00
|-  style="background:#fbb;"
| 2021-03-14|| Loss ||align=left| Seeoui Singmawynn || Channel 7 Boxing Stadium || Bangkok, Thailand || Decision|| 5 || 3:00
|-  style="background:#fbb;"
| 2020-10-26|| Loss ||align=left| PetchAmnat Sawansangmanja || Hatyai International Boxing Stadium || Songkhla province, Thailand || Decision|| 5 || 3:00
|-  style="background:#fbb;"
| 2020-07-12|| Loss ||align=left| Suesat Paeminburi || Channel 7 Boxing Stadium || Bangkok, Thailand || KO || 4 || 
|-
! style=background:white colspan=9 |
|-  style="background:#fbb;"
| 2020-02-09||Loss ||align=left| Petchrapa Sor.Sopit || Srithammaracha + Kiatpetch Super Fight|| Nakhon Si Thammarat, Thailand ||Decision|| 5 || 3:00
|-  style="background:#FFBBBB;"
| 2019-10-05|| Loss ||align=left| Petphusang KelaSport ||Suek Muay Thai Vithee Isaan Tai|| Buriram, Thailand || Decision || 5 || 3:00
|-  style="background:#CCFFCC;"
| 2019-07-21|| Win ||align=left| Petphusang KelaSport || Channel 7 Boxing Stadium || Bangkok, Thailand || Decision || 5 || 3:00
|-
! style=background:white colspan=9 |
|-  style="background:#CCFFCC;"
| 2019-05-29|| Win ||align=left| Puenkon Tor.Surat || Singmawin Rajadamnern Stadium || Bangkok, Thailand || KO (Left high kick) || 4 ||
|-  style="background:#FFBBBB;"
| 2019-02-24|| Loss ||align=left| Petphusang KelaSport || Channel 7 Boxing Stadium || Bangkok, Thailand || Decision || 5 || 3:00
|-  style="background:#FFBBBB;"
| 2018-12-26|| Loss ||align=left| Diesellek Wor.Wanchai ||  Rajadamnern Stadium || Bangkok, Thailand || Decision || 5 || 3:00
|-  style="background:#CCFFCC;"
| 2018-10-14|| Win ||align=left| Petphusang KelaSport || Channel 7 Boxing Stadium || Bangkok, Thailand || Decision || 5 || 3:00
|-  style="background:#FFBBBB;"
| 2018-09-09|| Loss ||align=left| Arthur Meyer || Super Champ || Bangkok, Thailand || Decision || 5 || 3:00
|-  style="background:#CCFFCC;"
| 2018-07-06|| Win ||align=left| Jakdao Witsanugonlagan || Samui Super Fight || Koh Samui, Thailand || Decision || 5 || 3:00
|-  style="background:#FFBBBB;"
| 2018-05-27|| Loss ||align=left| Jomhod Eminentair || Channel 7 Boxing Stadium || Bangkok, Thailand || TKO || 2 || 
|-
! style=background:white colspan=9 |
|-  style="background:#FFBBBB;"
| 2018-04-10|| Loss ||align=left| Sprinter Pangkongprab || Kiatpetch Super Fight Roadshow + Sawansangmanja || Khon Kaen, Thailand || Decision || 5 || 3:00
|-  style="background:#FFBBBB;"
| 2018-02-13|| Loss ||align=left| Jakdao Witsanugonlagan || Lumpinee Stadium || Thailand || Decision || 5 || 3:00
|-  style="background:#FFBBBB;"
| 2017-12-27|| Loss ||align=left| Boonlung Khongsuanpu Resort || Rajadamnern Stadium || Bangkok, Thailand || Decision || 5 || 3:00
|-  style="background:#CCFFCC;"
| 2017-11-09|| Win ||align=left| Boonlung Khongsuanpu Resort || Rajadamnern Stadium || Bangkok, Thailand || Decision || 5 || 3:00
|-  style="background:#FFBBBB;"
| 2017-09-03|| Loss ||align=left| Saknarinnoi Or Uansuwan || Channel 7 Boxing Stadium || Bangkok, Thailand || Decision || 5 || 3:00
|-  style="background:#FFBBBB;"
| 2017-06-17|| Loss ||align=left| Eisaku Ogasawara || KNOCK OUT vol.3 || Tokyo, Japan || TKO (Corner Stoppage) || 5 || 1:10
|-  style="background:#CCFFCC;"
| 2017-06-07|| Win ||align=left| Puenkon Tor.Surat || Rajadamnern Stadium || Bangkok, Thailand || Decision || 5 || 3:00
|-  style="background:#CCFFCC;"
| 2017-03-28|| Win ||align=left| Ronachai Tor.Ramintra|| Lumpinee Stadium || Bangkok, Thailand || Decision || 5 || 3:00
|-  style="background:#CCFFCC;"
| 2017-02-19|| Win ||align=left| Ronachai Tor.Ramintra || Channel 7 Boxing Stadium || Bangkok, Thailand || Decision || 5 || 3:00
|-
! style=background:white colspan=9 |
|-  style="background:#CCFFCC;"
| 2017-01-24|| Win ||align=left| Achanai Petchyindee || Lumpinee Stadium || Bangkok, Thailand || Decision || 5 || 3:00
|-  style="background:#FFBBBB;"
| 2016-12-05|| Loss ||align=left| Tenshin Nasukawa || Knock Out Vol. 0 || Tokyo, Japan|| KO (spinning back kick) || 1 || 0:38
|-  style="background:#CCFFCC;"
| 2016-11-15|| Win ||align=left| Sprinter Pangkongpap || Lumpinee Stadium || Bangkok, Thailand || Decision || 5 || 3:00
|-  style="background:#FFBBBB;"
| 2016-09-30|| Loss ||align=left| Yothin FA Group || Lumpinee Stadium ||Bangkok, Thailand || Decision  || 5 || 3:00
|-  style="background:#CCFFCC;"
| 2016-08-05|| Win ||align=left| Kengkla Por.Pekko ||  ||Hat Yai, Thailand || Decision  || 5 || 3:00
|-  style="background:#FFBBBB;"
| 2016-07-01|| Loss||align=left| Jomhod Eminentair || 80th Anniversary Commemoration Stadium ||Nakhon Ratchasima, Thailand || Decision  || 5 || 3:00
|-  style="background:#CCFFCC;"
| 2016-06-03|| Win ||align=left| Kengkla Por.Pekko || Lumpinee Stadium ||Bangkok, Thailand || Decision  || 5 || 3:00
|-
! style=background:white colspan=9 |
|-  style="background:#CCFFCC;"
| 2016-05-02|| Win ||align=left| Kaokarat Jitmuangnon || Rajadamnern Stadium ||Bangkok, Thailand || Decision  || 5 || 3:00
|-  style="background:#FFBBBB;"
| 2016-04-08|| Loss ||align=left| Jomhod Eminentair ||  || Khon Kaen, Thailand || Decision  || 5 || 3:00
|-  style="background:#FFBBBB;"
| 2016-03-16|| Loss ||align=left| Kengkla Por.Pekko ||  || Phra Nakhon Si Ayutthaya, Thailand || Decision  || 5 || 3:00
|-
! style=background:white colspan=9 |
|-  style="background:#CCFFCC;"
| 2016-02-23|| Win ||align=left| Kaokarat Jitmuangnon || Lumpinee Stadium || Bangkok, Thailand || Decision  || 5 || 3:00
|-  style="background:#CCFFCC;"
| 2016-01-29|| Win ||align=left| Fahseetong Sor.Jor Piek-U-Thai || Lumpinee Stadium || Bangkok, Thailand || KO || 4 ||
|-  style="background:#CCFFCC;"
| 2015-11-29|| Win ||align=left| Jomhod Eminentair || Lumpinee Stadium || Bangkok, Thailand || Decision  || 5 || 3:00
|-
! style=background:white colspan=9 |
|-  style="background:#FFBBBB;"
| 2015-10-13|| Loss ||align=left| Jomhod Eminentair || Lumpinee Stadium || Bangkok, Thailand || Decision  || 5 || 3:00
|-  style="background:#CCFFCC;"
| 2015-09-19|| Win ||align=left| Yu Wor.Wanchai || GRACHAN19×BOM IX.5 || Tokyo, Japan || KO (Left Middle Kick)|| 2 || 1:29
|-  style="background:#CCFFCC;"
| 2015-08-07|| Win ||align=left| Saknarinnoi Or Uansuwan || Lumpinee Stadium || Bangkok, Thailand || Decision  || 5 || 3:00
|-  style="background:#CCFFCC;"
| 2015-07-02|| Win ||align=left| Sprinter Petsiri Gym || Rajadamnern Stadium || Bangkok, Thailand || KO || 2 ||
|-  style="background:#FFBBBB;"
| 2015-04-29|| Loss ||align=left| Kengkla Por.Pekko || Rajadamnern Stadium || Bangkok, Thailand || KO || 3 ||
|-  style="background:#CCFFCC;"
| 2015-03-17|| Win ||align=left| Peankon Leknakhonsi || Lumpinee Stadium || Bangkok, Thailand || Decision  || 5 || 3:00
|-  style="background:#c5d2ea;"
| 2015-02-03|| Draw ||align=left| Jomhod Eminentair || Lumpinee Stadium || Bangkok, Thailand || Decision  || 5 || 3:00
|-  style="background:#FFBBBB;"
| 2014-12-09|| Loss ||align=left| Kengkla Por.Pekko || Lumpinee Stadium || Bangkok, Thailand || Decision  || 5 || 3:00
|-
! style=background:white colspan=9 |
|-  style="background:#FFBBBB;"
| 2014-11-09|| Loss||align=left| Jomhod Eminentair || Channel 7 Boxing Stadium || Bangkok, Thailand || Decision  || 5 || 3:00
|-
! style=background:white colspan=9 |
|-  style="background:#CCFFCC;"
| 2014-09-30|| Win ||align=left| Kengkla Por.Pekko || Lumpinee Stadium || Thailand || Decision  || 5 || 3:00
|-  style="background:#CCFFCC;"
| 2014-09-05|| Win ||align=left| Chaisiri Sakniranrat || Lumpinee Stadium || Thailand || KO || 4 ||
|-  style="background:#FFBBBB;"
| 2014-07-17|| loss ||align=left| Kengkla Por.Pekko ||  || Thailand || Decision  || 5 || 3:00
|-  style="background:#FFBBBB;"
| 2014-06-06|| Loss ||align=left| Panpayak Jitmuangnon || Lumpinee Stadium || Bangkok, Thailand || TKO (elbow/ref stoppage) || 5 ||3:00
|-  style="background:#CCFFCC;"
| 2014-04-08|| Win ||align=left| Panpayak Jitmuangnon || Lumpinee Stadium || Bangkok, Thailand || Decision || 5 || 3:00 
|-
! style=background:white colspan=9 |
|-  style="background:#FFBBBB;"
| 2014-02-11|| loss ||align=left| Phetpimai Or.Phimonsri || Lumpinee Stadium || Bangkok, Thailand || Decision  || 5 || 3:00
|-  style="background:#CCFFCC;"
| 2013-12-20|| Win ||align=left| Visanlek Seatrandiscovery || Lumpinee Stadium || Bangkok, Thailand || KO (Spinning back fist) || 5 ||
|-  style="background:#CCFFCC;"
| 2013-11-15|| Win ||align=left| Ponkrit Chor Churnkamol || Lumpinee Stadium || Bangkok, Thailand || Decision  || 5 || 3:00
|-  style="background:#CCFFCC;"
| 2013-10-03|| Win ||align=left| Ponkrit Chor Churnkamol || Rajadamnern Stadium || Bangkok, Thailand || Decision  || 5 || 3:00
|-  style="background:#CCFFCC;"
| 2013-09-06|| Win ||align=left| Yokphet Sompongmabtaput || Lumpinee Stadium || Bangkok, Thailand || Decision  || 5 || 3:00
|-
! style=background:white colspan=9 |
|-  style="background:#CCFFCC;"
| 2013-08-02|| Win ||align=left| Kusagonnoi Sor Joonsen || Lumpinee Stadium || Bangkok, Thailand || Decision  || 5 || 3:00
|-  style="background:#FFBBBB;"
| 2013-07-09|| Loss ||align=left| Prajanchai Por.Phetnamtong || Lumpinee Stadium || Bangkok, Thailand || Decision  || 5 || 3:00
|-  style="background:#CCFFCC;"
| 2013-06-09|| Win ||align=left| Kengkla Por.Pekko || Channel 7 Boxing Stadium || Bangkok, Thailand || Decision  || 5 || 3:00
|-
! style=background:white colspan=9 |
|-  style="background:#FFBBBB;"
| 2013-05-07|| Loss ||align=left| Kengkla Por.Pekko || Channel 7 Boxing Stadium || Bangkok, Thailand || Decision  || 5 || 3:00
|-  style="background:#FFBBBB;"
| 2013-03-08|| Loss ||align=left| Yokphet Sompongmataput || Lumpinee Stadium || Bangkok, Thailand || Decision  || 5 || 3:00
|-  style="background:#FFBBBB;"
| 2013-02-05|| Loss ||align=left| Yokphet Sompongmataput || Lumpinee Stadium || Bangkok, Thailand || Decision  || 5 || 3:00
|-
! style=background:white colspan=9 |
|-  style="background:#CCFFCC;"
| 2013-01-04 || Win ||align=left| Superlek Kiatmuu9  || Lumpinee Stadium || Bangkok, Thailand || Decision || 5 || 3:00
|-  style="background:#CCFFCC;"
| 2012-12-06 || Win ||align=left| Petbaankek Sor.Sommai  || Rajadamnern Stadium || Bangkok, Thailand || Decision || 5 || 3:00
|-  style="background:#CCFFCC;"
| 2012-11-06 || Win ||align=left| Pentai Sitnumnoi  ||  || Bangkok, Thailand || KO || 4 ||
|-  style="background:#FFBBBB;"
| 2012-10-12|| Loss ||align=left| Yokphet Sompongmataput || Lumpinee Stadium || Bangkok, Thailand || Decision  || 5 || 3:00
|-  style="background:#FFBBBB;"
| 2012-09-07|| Loss ||align=left| Chokprecha Kor.Sakuncha || Lumpinee Stadium || Bangkok, Thailand || Decision  || 5 || 3:00
|-  style="background:#CCFFCC;"
| 2012-07-27|| Win ||align=left| Chokprecha Kor.Sakuncha || Channel 7 Boxing Stadium || Bangkok, Thailand || KO (Left high kick) || 5 ||
|-  style="background:#CCFFCC;"
| 2012-06-08|| Win ||align=left| Choknumchai Sitjakong || Lumpinee Stadium || Bangkok, Thailand || Decision  || 5 || 3:00
|-
! style=background:white colspan=9 |
|-  style="background:#CCFFCC;"
| 2012-05-15|| Win ||align=left| Nuangthep EminentAir || Lumpinee Stadium || Bangkok, Thailand || Decision  || 5 || 3:00
|-  style="background:#FFBBBB;"
| 2012-01-29|| Loss ||align=left| Phunkrit Kor.Kampanat || Channel 7 Boxing Stadium || Bangkok, Thailand || Decision  || 5 || 3:00
|-  style="background:#FFBBBB;"
| 2012-01-29|| Loss ||align=left| Mongkolchai Kwaitonggym || Channel 7 Boxing Stadium || Bangkok, Thailand || Decision  || 5 || 3:00
|-  style="background:#CCFFCC;"
| 2011-12-22|| Win ||align=left| Rataket Teeded99 || Birthday Celebrations Of Rajadamnern Stadium || Bangkok, Thailand || Decision  || 5 || 3:00
|-  style="background:#FFBBBB;"
| 2011-11-22|| Loss ||align=left| Satanfah EminentAir || || Bangkok, Thailand || Decision  || 5 || 3:00
|-  style="background:#CCFFCC;"
| 2011-10-04|| Win ||align=left| Nuangthep EminentAir || Lumpinee Stadium || Bangkok, Thailand || KO (uppercuts)  ||1
|2:53
|-  style="background:#CCFFCC;"
| 2011-09-06|| Win ||align=left| Chokprecha Kor.Sakuncha || Lumpinee Stadium || Bangkok, Thailand || Decision  || 5 || 3:00
|-
! style=background:white colspan=9 |
|-  style="background:#CCFFCC;"
| 2011-06-28|| Win ||align=left| Chokprecha Kor.Sakuncha ||  || Bangkok, Thailand || Decision  || 5 || 3:00
|-  style="background:#FFBBBB;"
| 2011-03-08|| Loss ||align=left| Nuangthep EminentAir || Lumpinee Stadium || Bangkok, Thailand || Decision  || 5 || 3:00
|-  style="background:#cfc;"
| 2011-01-02|| Win ||align=left| Kingsang Kor.Saklamphun || Channel 7 Boxing Stadium || Bangkok, Thailand || KO || 3 ||
|-  style="background:#FFBBBB;"
| 2010-10-19|| Loss ||align=left| Werachai Wor Wiwatanont || Lumpinee Stadium || Bangkok, Thailand || KO || 3 ||
|-  style="background:#FFBBBB;"
| 2010-09-24|| Loss ||align=left| Mongkolchai Kwaitonggym || Lumpinee Stadium || Bangkok, Thailand || Decision  || 5 || 3:00
|-
! style=background:white colspan=9 |
|-  style="background:#FFBBBB;"
| 2010-07-20|| Loss ||align=left| Mongkolchai Kwaitonggym || Lumpinee Stadium || Bangkok, Thailand || Decision  || 5 || 3:00
|-  style="background:#CCFFCC;"
| 2010-05-23|| Win ||align=left| Supernoi Chor Patcharapon || Channel 7 Boxing Stadium || Bangkok, Thailand || Decision  || 5 || 3:00
|-
! style=background:white colspan=9 |
|-  style="background:#CCFFCC;"
| 2010-02-26|| Win ||align=left| Mongkolchai Kwaitonggym || Lumpinee Stadium || Bangkok, Thailand || TKO || 2 ||
|-  style="background:#CCFFCC;"
| 2009-12-08|| Win ||align=left| Weerachai Wor.Wiwattanon || Lumpinee Stadium || Bangkok, Thailand || Decision || 5 || 3:00
|-
! style=background:white colspan=9 |
|-  style="background:#fbb;"
| 2009-10-13|| Loss||align=left| Weerachai Wor.Wiwattanon || Lumpinee Stadium || Bangkok, Thailand || Decision || 5 || 3:00
|-  style="background:#CCFFCC;"
| 2009-08-31|| Win ||align=left| Thanusueklek Or.Kwanmuang|| Rajadamnern Stadium || Bangkok, Thailand || Decision || 5 || 3:00
|-  style="background:#CCFFCC;"
| 2009-04-23|| Win ||align=left| Nampetch Sor.Thanthip|| Rajadamnern Stadium || Bangkok, Thailand || Decision || 5 || 3:00
|-
| colspan=9 | Legend:

References

Wanchalong PK.Saenchai
Living people
1986 births
Wanchalong PK.Saenchai